Joseph Scott Durant (born April 7, 1964) is an American professional golfer who plays on the PGA Tour Champions. He was previously a member of the PGA Tour, where he was a four-time winner.

Early life
Durant was born in Pensacola, Florida. He attended Huntingdon College in Montgomery, Alabama, where he majored in Marketing and graduated in 1987. At Huntingdon, he was a three-time NAIA All-American and won the 1987 NAIA Championship.

Professional career
Durant turned professional in 1987. He has won four times on the PGA Tour. Durant won the 2001 Bob Hope Chrysler Classic with a score of 324 (-36), setting the tournament record which stands today. He has featured in the top 50 of the Official World Golf Ranking. His best finish in a major is T18 at the 2007 PGA Championship. In 2007 and 2008, he finished No. 129 on the PGA Tour official money list, and began playing some on the Nationwide Tour. By 2009, he was down to No. 131 and lost his PGA Tour card; however, he rebounded in 2010 to finish No. 115 on the money list to earn a spot on the Tour for 2011.

Durant began playing on the Champions Tour after turning 50 in April 2014.

Professional wins (9)

PGA Tour wins (4)

PGA Tour playoff record (0–1)

Nike Tour wins (1)

PGA Tour Champions wins (4)

PGA Tour Champions playoff record (1–0)

Results in major championships

CUT = missed the half-way cut
"T" = tied

Summary

Most consecutive cuts made – 2 (1998 U.S. Open – 1998 PGA)
Longest streak of top-10s – 0

Results in The Players Championship

CUT = missed the halfway cut
"T" indicates a tie for a place

Results in World Golf Championships

QF, R16, R32, R64 = Round in which player lost in match play
"T" = Tied

Results in senior major championships
Results not in chronological order before 2022.

CUT = missed the halfway cut
"T" indicates a tie for a place
WD = withdrew
NT = No tournament due to COVID-19 pandemic

See also
1992 PGA Tour Qualifying School graduates
1996 Nike Tour graduates
2013 Web.com Tour Finals graduates

References

External links

American male golfers
PGA Tour golfers
PGA Tour Champions golfers
Korn Ferry Tour graduates
Golfers from Florida
Huntingdon College alumni
Sportspeople from Pensacola, Florida
1964 births
Living people